2647 km is a rural locality (a railway station) in Zameletyonovskoye Rural Settlement of Lyubinsky District, Russia. The population was 4 as of 2010.

Streets 
There is no streets with titles.

References 

Rural localities in Omsk Oblast